A Journey to the Centre of the Earth is a side-scrolling action-adventure platform game released for the Commodore 64 in 1984, and re-released by CRL in 1985 under the title Journey.

Plot
The introduction simply places the player in the role of an unnamed explorer who must delve into a subterranean labyrinth to locate 11 hidden treasures and return them to the surface.

Gameplay

The game takes places in a massive, side-scrolling underground maze, throughout which is hidden 11 treasures. The goal is to find all of the treasures and return them to the surface. At the beginning of the game, the player character can run, jump, and climb. However, the player can obtain items that will expand their abilities, most of which are required to beat the game. They include dynamite to blow open walls, umbrellas to protect against falling rocks, oxygen pills to breathe underwater, a gun to shoot enemies, and more. The player has only 8 inventory slots, and each item and treasure occupies one; furthermore, the player cannot jump when carrying 6 or more, and cannot climb when carrying 8. Consequently, the player must backtrack to the surface several times over the course of the game to unload their currently-held treasure. The player can also drop unneeded items at any time. Items can be selected with the number keys on the keyboard and are used with the joystick's fire button.

Reception

A Journey to the Centre of the Earth received mostly positive reviews from the magazines of the day. C&VG gave it 8/10 for graphics, 8/10 for sound, 7/10 for value, and 8/10 for playability. Your Commodore gave it 5/10 for originality, 5/10 for playability, 3/10 for graphics, and 3/10 for value-for-money, finding the controls difficult but nevertheless concluding, "I recommend this game to anyone who wants a few hours of fun". Commodore Horizons gave it 5/8 for graphics, 5/8 for sonics, and 6/8 for gameplay, calling it an "agreeable arcade adventure . . . Unremarkable graphically; but good fun to play"

References

External links

A Journey to the Centre of the Earth at GameBase 64

1984 video games
Action-adventure games
Commodore 64 games
Commodore 64-only games
Metroidvania games
Platform games
Video games developed in the United Kingdom
Works based on Journey to the Center of the Earth
Video games based on works by Jules Verne